Muni "Lily" He (born 17 June 1999) is a Chinese professional golfer who plays on the U.S.-based LPGA Tour.

Early life and education
Muni He was born in Chengdu, Sichuan, China. Her father, a hotelier and restaurateur, introduced her to golf at a young age and by age 5, she was already playing competitively. Her family moved to Vancouver and later, San Diego. She studied at Torrey Pines High School in San Diego. In the United States, she was able to play golf more regularly and she joined San Diego and Southern California junior golf tournaments, alongside U.S. Kids' Golf and American Junior Golf Association events. Before turning pro, she spent one year at the University of Southern California, majoring in communications.

Career
As an amateur, she won the 2015 Polo Junior Classic and the 2017 Minnesota Invitational. She had four starts on the LPGA Tour and made the cut at the 2015 U.S. Women's Open where she tied for 53rd place. She turned professional in December 2017 and claimed her first Symetra Tour win in July 2018 at the inaugural Prasco Charity Championship in Maineville, Ohio. In November 2019, she won the eight-round LPGA Q-Series to secure her 2020 LPGA Tour membership. She has signed endorsement deals with Nike and WeChat.

Personal life 
Muni He has been publicly dating Thai-British Williams Formula One driver Alex Albon since 2019.

Amateur wins
2012 Randy Wise Junior Open
2013 PING Phoenix Junior at ASU Karsten
2015 Polo Golf Junior Classic
2017 Minnesota Invitational

Source:

Professional wins (1)

Symetra Tour wins (1)

Results in major championships

NT = no tournament
"T" = tied

Summary

LPGA Tour career summary

 Official as of 2022 season

References

External links

Chinese female golfers
USC Trojans women's golfers
LPGA Tour golfers
Sportspeople from Chengdu
Sportspeople from Vancouver
Golfers from San Diego
Chinese emigrants to Canada
Chinese emigrants to the United States
1999 births
Living people